Huai Nam Chun is a watercourse in Phechaboon Province, Thailand. It is a tributary of the Pasak River, part of the 
Chao praya River basin.

Chun